Nemilje is a dispersed settlement in the hills west of Kranj in the Upper Carniola region of Slovenia
.

References

External links

Nemilje on Geopedia

Populated places in the City Municipality of Kranj